Ilana C. Frank is a Canadian film and television producer and founder of ICF Films (formerly Thump Inc.), best known for producing the award-winning series The Eleventh Hour, Rookie Blue, and Saving Hope. The Eleventh Hour, which she executively produced and co-created, won the Canadian Screen Award for Best Dramatic Series in 2003 and 2005, and was nominated for over 30 Gemini Awards, winning in all major categories.

Life and career
Frank has a background in theater. Frank worked for several years producing theatrical plays before steering her career towards film and television producing. In the mid-1980s she joined Norstar Entertainment, a Toronto-based production and distribution company, as VP of Production, where she oversaw the work on over 20 feature films. She met her ex-husband, actor Maury Chaykin, in 1974 on the set of a play called Tony's Woman, though they divorced in 1993. She received an award from the Writers Guild of Canada (WGC) in 2007 for mentoring Canadian talent.

Filmography as producer

Television credits
 The Eleventh Hour (2002-2005)
 Would Be Kings (2008)
 Clean (2008)
 Rookie Blue (2010 - 2015)
 Saving Hope (2012–present)
 The Detail (2018–present)
 Nurses (2019–present)

Motion picture credits
 Mania: The Intruder (TV Movie) (1986)
 Bullies (1986)
 High Stakes (1986)
 Prom Night II (1987)
 Blindside (1987)
 Higher Education (1988)
 Norman's Awesome Experience (1988)
 Cold Comfort (1989)
 Prom Night III: The Last Kiss (1990)
 Oh, What a Night (1992)
 Liar's Edge (1992)
 Blown Away (1993)
 Cold Sweat (1993)
 The Club (1994)
 Boulevard (1994)
 Jungleground (1995)
 Salt Water Moose (1996)
 Pale Saints (1997)
 No Contest II (1997)
 Men with Guns (1997)
 The Life Before This (1999)
 Of Murder and Memory (TV Movie) (2008)
  Something Red (also Director and Writer) (2011)
 Method (short film) (2013)
 Parachute (short film) (2014)
 The Offer (short film (2015)

References

External links
 
 http://www.icffilms.com/

Canadian film producers
Living people
Canadian film executives
Canadian corporate directors
Canadian women film producers
Year of birth missing (living people)